Baladoor is a 2008 Indian Telugu-language action drama film directed by K. R. Udhayashankar and produced by D. Suresh Babu under Suresh Productions. The film stars Ravi Teja, Krishna, and Anushka Shetty while Chandra Mohan, Pradeep Rawat, Sunil and Brahmanandam play supporting roles. The film has music composed by K. M. Radha Krishnan with editing performed by Marthand K. Venkatesh. The film was released on 14 August 2008. The film was later dubbed in Hindi as Dhamkee in 2011 and remade into Oriya as Mu Kana Ete Khara.

Premise 
Chanti respects his uncle Rama Krishna more than his father, Purushotham. Rama Krishna has enmity with Umapathi because of something that happened 20 years ago. Later, Chanti is kicked out of their house because of some misunderstandings, and Umapathi is ready to put Rama Krishna down. How Chanti secretly helps Rama Krishna in bringing the enemy down and reunites with his family forms the rest of the story.

Cast

Soundtrack 

K. M. Radha Krishnan composed the soundtrack album, which is released on 30 July 2008 by Aditya Music. Chandrabose, Peddada Murthy, and Ananta Sriram gave the lyrics whereas actor Venkatesh released the album CD.

Reception 
Radhika Rajmani of Rediff.com rated the film  stars out of 5 and wrote: "Uday Shankar takes up a stereotypical storyline in Baladoor and manages to entertain with a satisfactory screenplay in a formulaic way with a mix of action, comedy and romance." Zamin Ryot Alluru Rahim in criticized the film's "lackluster screenplay" and added that the director did not handle sentiment properly. In an other negative review, Y. Sunita Chowdhary of The Hindu stated, "Baladoor is an average film, as the banner doesn’t offer nothing new in narration."

References

External links 
 
 

2000s Telugu-language films
2008 action drama films
2008 films
Films shot in Uzbekistan
Indian action drama films
2000s masala films
Suresh Productions films
Telugu films remade in other languages
Films scored by K. M. Radha Krishnan